Cnemaspis minang is a species of gecko endemic to Sumatra in Indonesia.

References

Cnemaspis
Fauna of Sumatra
Reptiles of Indonesia
Reptiles described in 2017